Ryan Powell (born 20 March 1982) is an Australian former professional rugby league footballer who played for the St. George Illawarra Dragons.

References

Australian rugby league players
St. George Illawarra Dragons players
Living people
1982 births
Rugby league second-rows
Rugby league locks
Place of birth missing (living people)